St. Mary's Convent is a Roman Catholic convent situated in Ollur, Thrissur city of India. It is the first convent in the present territory started by the Syro-Malabar Catholic Archeparchy of Thrissur. It has become a great tourist and pilgrimage attraction after the Canonisation of Euphrasia Eluvathingal (Evuprasiamma).It is a modern convent compared  to the other monasteries.

History
The convent was started by the Metropolitan Archbishop of Thrissur John Menachery. It opened the door for the nuns in 24 May 1900. Saint Euphrasia Eluvathingal (Evuprasiamma) stayed in this convent from 1900 till death. She was the Assistant Superior and in-charge of the novices from 1904-1910. During this period, Blessed Maria Theresa Chiramel also stayed in the convent. From 1913-1916, she was the Superior of the convent.

References

Archdiocese of Thrissur
Convents of the Catholic Church in Asia
Eastern Catholic monasteries in India
1900 establishments in India
Churches in Thrissur